"Be Mine" is a song by French DJ duo Ofenbach. The song has peaked at number five on the French Singles Chart. A remixes EP featuring remixes from Agrume, Antiyu and Stone Van Brooken was released. The song was certified diamond by SNEP.

Music video 
The music video featured Ofenbach tied to a chair, tortured, abused and controlled by a 'visibly fierce' woman.

Track listing

Charts

Weekly charts

Year-end charts

Certifications

References

2017 singles
2017 songs
Electronic songs
Deep house songs
Ofenbach (DJs) songs